Lindsey Ann Fraser (born 1958), is a female former diver who competed for Great Britain and England.

Diving career
Fraser represented Great Britain at the 1980 Summer Olympics and the 1984 Summer Olympics.

She also represented England in the 10 metres platform, at the 1982 Commonwealth Games in Brisbane, Queensland, Australia.

References

1958 births
Living people
English female divers
Divers at the 1982 Commonwealth Games
Olympic divers of Great Britain
Divers at the 1980 Summer Olympics
Divers at the 1984 Summer Olympics
Commonwealth Games competitors for England